Maximiliano Gutiérrez Hoppe (born December 18, 2002) is a Mexican professional stock car racing driver. He competes part-time in the NASCAR Craftsman Truck Series, driving the No. 22 Ford F-150 for AM Racing.

He also last competed full-time in the NASCAR PEAK Mexico Series, driving the No. 3 Chevrolet Camaro.

Racing career

Early career
Gutiérrez began racing at 3 years old, racing in the Mexico National Super Kart Championship in 2006, where he finished third in the standings in the Baby Stock category. He returned in 2007, where he would once again end up finishing third in the standings in the Modified Baby 50 category. From 2008 to 2013, he would win six consecutive Super Kart Championship titles.  

In 2017, Gutiérrez would compete full-time in the NASCAR Mikel's Truck Series, where he would end up winning Rookie of the Year honors. He would go on to win the championship in 2018. 

Gutiérrez would move up to the NASCAR FedEx Challenge (now Mexico T4 Series) in 2019, getting 2 wins, 7 top 5s, and 8 top 10s, ranking 5th in the standings. He returned to the series in 2020, where he won the championship with 5 wins, 10 top 5s, and 11 top 10s.

Gutiérrez moved up to the NASCAR PEAK Mexico Series full-time in 2021. He would earn 8 top 5s, 10 top 10s, and finish 4th in the final standings.

ARCA Menards Series East
On September 17, 2020, Gutiérrez made his ARCA Menards Series East debut at Bristol Motor Speedway, driving the No. 53 for Troy Williams Racing, where he would start 26th and finish 14th. He finished off the East Series at Five Flags Speedway, starting 14th and finished 12th. He did not return to Troy Williams Racing after 2020.

On February 5, 2021, Gutiérrez announced that he will drive full-time in the East Series, driving the No. 30 Ford Fusion for Rette Jones Racing.

On February 8, 2021, three days after the announcement, Gutiérrez earned his first career East Series win, after taking the lead on the final turn, beating out Sammy Smith and Taylor Gray in a three wide finish. He would finish out the season with 1 win, 2 top 5s, and 5 top 10s, and ranked 4th in the standings.

ARCA Menards Series
Gutiérrez would make one start in the 2020 ARCA Menards Series season, driving for Troy Williams Racing. He drove the car at Bristol Motor Speedway, starting 26th and finishing 14th.

He returned for the 2021 ARCA Menards Series, running the races that's paired with the East Series, his best finish being 12th at Iowa Speedway.

He returned to the series in 2022, where he scored his first career top 10 at Talladega Superspeedway in April.

ARCA Menards Series West
Gutiérrez made his first ARCA Menards Series West start at Phoenix Raceway, where he started 12th and finished 21st.

Craftsman Truck Series
On April 23, 2022, it was announced that Gutiérrez would make his NASCAR Camping World Truck Series debut in the 2022 North Carolina Education Lottery 200, driving the No. 37 for AM Racing. Due to the small amount of owner points for the 37 truck, Gutiérrez will attempt race in on speed. Since only 35 cars were entered, Gutiérrez would make his debut. He started 31st and would finish in 26th. Gutiérrez would make his second start at the 2022 Rackley Roofing 200, this time in the 22 truck, as the original driver, Austin Wayne Self, was on paternity leave after the birth of his daughter. Gutiérrez originally scored 17th in qualifying, but due to his truck being too low to the ground, he would start from the rear. He would finish in 8th, scoring his first career top 10 in only his second start.

Personal life 
On January 29, 2023, Max and his brother, Federico, were travelling near Valle de Bravo, Mexico in a Porsche Boxster, when their vehicle collided with a Ford Explorer pickup truck. Max was airlifted to a hospital in Mexico City with undisclosed injuries, while Federico, who was driving the vehicle at the time, was pronounced dead at the scene. The investigation is currently ongoing.

Motorsport career results

NASCAR
(key) (Bold – Pole position awarded by qualifying time. Italics – Pole position earned by points standings or practice time. * – Most laps led.)

Craftsman Truck Series

ARCA Menards Series

ARCA Menards Series East

ARCA Menards Series West

References

External links

2002 births
Living people
ARCA Menards Series drivers
NASCAR drivers
Mexican racing drivers
Racing drivers from Mexico City